Luzula comosa is a species of flowering plant in the rush family known by the common name Pacific woodrush. It is native to western North America from Alaska to California to Colorado, where it can be found in moist spots in forests and meadows and many other types of habitat. It is a perennial herb quite variable in appearance, often forming small, narrow grasslike tufts. The erect inflorescence is tipped with a series of clustered spikelike flowers. The dark brown perianth parts open to reveal 6 stamens tipped with large anthers.

References

Jepson Manual Treatment
C.Michael Hogan ed. 2010. Luzula comosa. Encyclopedia of Life

External links
CalFlora Database: Luzula comosa (Pacific woodrush)
Luzula comosa — U.C. Photo gallery

comosa
Flora of the Western United States
Grasses of the United States
Native grasses of California
Flora of the California desert regions
Flora of the Sierra Nevada (United States)
Plants described in 1823
Flora without expected TNC conservation status